The 2016–17 snooker season was a series of professional snooker tournaments played between 5 May 2016 and 1 May 2017. 

The number of ranking events was increased in 2016/17, with a target of 20 ranking events for 2017/18. According to the World Snooker chairman Barry Hearn, total prize money for the World Snooker Tour in 2016/17 hit £10 million for the first time ever. The trophy for the Masters was renamed the Paul Hunter trophy in perpetuity, in memory of the three-time Masters champion who died in 2006.

The Snooker Shoot Out became a ranking event for the first time. The Australian Goldfields Open has been cancelled.

The Players Championship featured the top-16 players on the one year ranking list, as the Players Tour Championship has been cancelled and no order of merit was issued.

The new Home Nations Series was introduced in this season with the English Open, Northern Ireland Open, Scottish Open and Welsh Open tournaments. The winner of all four tournaments could earn a massive £1 million bonus prize.

Mark Selby won five ranking events during the season with Anthony McGill and Judd Trump each winning twice. Trump appeared in five ranking event finals during the season.

Players
Countries:
 
 
 
 
 
 
 
 
 
 
 

The top 64 players from the prize money rankings after the 2016 World Championship, and the 30 players earning a two-year card the previous year automatically qualified for the season (Vinnie Calabrese has resigned his membership). The top eight players from the European Tour Order of Merit and top two players from the Asian Tour Order of Merit, who have not already qualified for the Main Tour, also qualify. Another two players come from the EBSA Qualifying Tour Play-Offs, and a further twelve places were available through the Q School. The rest of the places on to the tour come from the amateur events and national governing body nominations. Yan Bingtao's two-year tour card will commence this season. Also, since Steve Davis and Stephen Hendry have both retired from professional play, only James Wattana was offered an Invitational Tour Card. The list of all professional players in the 2016/2017 season includes 129 players.

New professional players
All players listed below received a tour card for two seasons.

EBSA European Championship winner:  Jak Jones
EBSA European Under-21 Championship winner:  Josh Boileau
ACBS Asian Championship winner:  Kritsanut Lertsattayathorn
ACBS Asian Under-21 Championship winner:  Wang Yuchen
Oceania Championship winner:   Kurt Dunham

European Tour Order of MeritAsian Tour Order of Merit

EBSA Qualifying Tour Play-Offs'''

Q School
Event 1

Event 2

Order of Merit

CBSA China Tour

Invitational Tour Card

Deferred Tour Card

Calendar 
The following tables outline the dates and results of all events of the World Snooker Tour, World Women's Snooker, the World Seniors Tour, and other events.

World Snooker Tour

World Ladies Billiards and Snooker

Seniors events

Other events

Points distribution 
2016/2017 points distribution for World Snooker Tour ranking events:

Notes

References

External links
Snooker season 2016/2017 at Snooker.org

2016
Season 2016
Season 2017